Her Husband's Honor, also known under its working title of The Gadabout, is a 1918 American silent drama film directed by Burton L. King and starring Edna Goodrich. It was produced and distributed by Mutual Film.

Cast
Edna Goodrich as Nancy Page
David Powell as Richard Page
T. Tamamoto as Tato Usaki (credited as Thomas Tommamato)
Barbara Allen as Lila Davenport
Clarence Heritage as David Davenport

Preservation
With no prints of Her Husband's Honor located in any film archives, it is a lost film.

References

External links

1918 films
American silent feature films
Lost American films
American black-and-white films
Films directed by Burton L. King
Silent American drama films
1918 drama films
1918 lost films
Lost drama films
1910s American films